Scorpaena plumieri, the spotted scorpionfish, is a species of venomous marine ray-finned fish belonging to the family Scorpaenidae, the scorpionfishes.  It is found in the Atlantic Ocean.

Taxonomy
Scorpaena plumieri was first formally described in 1789 by the German physician and naturalist Marcus Elieser Bloch with the type locality given as Martinique. The specific name honors Charles Plumier, a Franciscan monk and naturalist, who discovered this fish at Martinique, Bloch based his description on Plumier’s drawing of it.

Description 
It has a robust body, with a dorsal fin with 12 spines, nine soft rays, and the pectoral fin with 18–21 fin rays. Venom glands are associated with dorsal fin spines to defend against predators. It has a suborbital crest formed by infraorbital bones, two and three, with two spines respectively. Under the eyes, they have fleshy plumes, known as "cirrae", with flaps of skin around the chin and head. They have wide and fan-shaped pectoral fins, the dorsal fin is continuous and notched, while the caudal fin is truncated. The maxilla reaches beyond the eyes and the mouth is terminal. It has a well developed occipital pit. It is the largest scorpion fish in the Atlantic and Caribbean Ocean, the largest reported size was 45 cm long, although on average, this species grows from 18 to 36 cm, and can weigh 1.55 kg.

The color of this species varies from brown to black with a light background, the areas before the caudal fin are abruptly paler. The head has dark spots, the ventral surface is orange / red. Its fins have dark bands and spots, with a light background, but most often with green spots. In the middle and near the end, the tail fin has dark bars. Inside the fins of the chest, it is stained white. When It feels threatened, the pectoral fins extend and display a bright color.

Distribution and habitat 
It inhabits the western Atlantic Ocean, from Bermudas to Massachusetts, from the northern Gulf of Mexico to southern Brazil. It is also found in the Eastern Atlantic Ocean, around Ascension Island and St. Helena. They inhabit shallow coral reefs and rocky areas, moderately common from 5–55 meters deep. It remains motionless, on the lower substrate, waiting for prey to attack.

Diet 
Like other scorpion fish, these animals do not actively hunt, as they are ambush predators, camouflaging themselves to approach prey. It uses its large mouth as a vacuum and sucks its prey quickly, preys of this species include fishes and crustaceans.

Reproduction 
The reproduction of these animals is not well known, it is known that it is oviparous, with the female producing transparent or greenish eggs.

Predators 
The main predators of this species include the schoolmaster (Lutjanus apodus), and mutton snapper (Lutjanus analis).

Venom 
The spines located on the back of the fish can inject venom, so these animals can pose a danger to humans. The venom is composed of hemorrhagic, hemolytic and proteolytic activities, as well as cardiotoxins, which result in a drop in blood pressure, and heart and respiratory rate. Symptoms include excruciating pain at the site, followed by edema, erythema and occasionally skin necrosis, other symptoms include adenopathy, nausea, vomiting, agitation, malaise, sweating, tachycardia, arrhythmias, difficult to breath and severe hypotension. The main treatment for pain is to immerse the affected limb in hot water (45–50 ° C) until the pain is relieved. The LD50 for the venom of this species is 0.28 mg / kg.

References 

plumieri
Fish described in 1789